St. Aldhelm's Church or St Aldhelm's Church or any variation thereof may refer to:

England

St Aldhelm's Church, Poole, Dorset
St Aldhelm's Church, Radipole, Dorset
St Aldhelm's Church, Boveridge, Dorset
St Aldhelm's Church, Doulting, Somerset
St Aldhelm's Church, Lytchett Heath, Dorset
St Aldhelm's Church, Belchalwell, Dorset
St Aldhelm's Roman Catholic Church, Malmesbury, Wiltshire
St. Aldhelm's Chapel, St. Aldhelm's Head, Dorset
Church of St Aldhelm and St Eadburgha, Broadway, Somerset